is a public park in Nakano Ward, Tokyo, Japan. It is the largest park in Nakano Ward.

Facilities
 Within the grounds of the park there is a large, six-story building called .
 The park also has a multipurpose open area, wooded area, wooden playground equipment, sandbox, swings, water fountain, toilet (with wheelchair access), study room, benches, lawn, biotope pond, and dogwood hill.

Gallery

Access
The park is a 6-minute walk from Shin-egota Station on the Toei Ōedo subway line.
It can also be reached by bus from Ekoda Station (7 mins), Nerima Station (19 mins) and Nakano Station (20 mins).
The park's opening hours are from 6 AM to 11 PM, and the entry is free of charge.

See also
 Parks and gardens in Tokyo
 National Parks of Japan

References

Parks and gardens in Tokyo